Urolagnia (also urophilia, and, more colloquially, a golden shower or watersports) associates sexual excitement with the sight or thought of urine or urination, and may also refer to such behaviours or acts. It is a paraphilia.

Golden shower is slang for the practice of urinating on another person for sexual pleasure.

Overview
Urolagnia is an inclination to derive sexual satisfaction from the vision or idea of urination. It is a paraphilia. During the activity, urine may be consumed or the person may bathe in it. Other variations include arousal from wetting or seeing someone else urinate in their pants or underclothes, or wetting the bed. Other forms of urolagnia may involve a tendency to be sexually aroused by smelling urine-soaked clothing or body parts. In many cases, a strong correlation or conditioning arises between urine smell or sight, and the sexual act. For some individuals the phenomenon may include a diaper fetish and/or arousal from infantilism.

Urolagnia is sometimes associated with, or confused with the Japanese practice of omorashi, arousal from having a full bladder or a sexual attraction to someone else experiencing the discomfort or pain of a full bladder, possibly a sadomasochistic inclination.

Common variations
 Golden shower: A shower or stream of urine is directed onto another person or persons.
 Clothes wetting: The person is sexually aroused by wetting one's clothing or observing another person doing so. Usually that person prefers to stage the wetting so that their legs (or other body parts) become soaked with urine. The warm sensation felt when urine trickles on the body seems to give very relaxing and pleasurable feelings to the person. In many cases, that person is also aroused by smelling body parts that have a urine scent. Others get aroused by telling some people about when they lost control and wet themselves. Some prefer a particular type of clothing to urinate.
 Exhibitionism: Becoming noticeably desperate or wetting oneself with the express purpose of being seen by strangers. Practitioners have described going to public places such as a mall or a park. Some intend to create situations where others can see their wet clothing.
 Human urinal: Within the BDSM community, some individuals desire to be used as a human urinal and some desire to use a human urinal.  The submissive  is usually strictly forbidden from placing their lips directly on the body of the dominant so the practice routinely involves them receiving much of the spray all over their face, hair and body; however, another way of doing this that applies mostly to male dominants, is to place the mouth on the head of the penis and drink the urine as it is released. One other, less common variation of this kink involves the dominant partner urinating inside the submissive partner's vagina or anus, which is usually followed up by the submissive partner ejecting the urine from their orifice(s).
 Omorashi: The act of holding one's own urine until the need to urinate is urgent, making another hold in their urine, or watching another person with an urgent need to urinate. This fetish sometimes originates from childhood memories of needing, or of seeing another needing, to urinate. Arousal may be triggered by seeing the body movements or facial expressions of that person. It can also be heightened by the person saying that they have to urinate. The arousal from being desperate comes from the sensation of having a full bladder.
 Voyeurism: Seeing another urinate without the person's knowledge either through video taping by a hidden camera, or by lurking in locations where people are urinating or are likely to have an urge to urinate.

Frequency
Jennifer Eve Rehor of San Francisco State University points out that such data as exists on what she calls "unconventional" or "kink" sexual behavior is generally problematic because of the way that it has been collected, through criminal and clinical case studies. Behavior that appears neither in criminal trials nor in clinical studies (for example, because the individuals concerned do not commonly seek professional help) is therefore under-reported. Rehor therefore surveyed 1,764 female participants in "kink" behavior (mostly association with BDSM) in 2010–11, receiving 1,580 valid responses. What Rehor calls "urine play" is relatively infrequent, with only 36.52% of her sample reporting having done it or having had it done to them. In contrast, 93.99% of her sample reported having done spanking or having had it done to them, and  61.96% reported having used or been exposed to feathers/fur. It is impossible to extrapolate Rehor's data onto the general population, but her study does give a guide to prevalence in the North American BDSM community.

In Channel 4's 2017 nationwide Great British Sex survey, watersports (or urolagnia) was ranked ninth in popularity among sexual fetishes in the UK.

Notable cases

 Chuck Berry: American musician who was featured urinating on a woman in a sex tape, and was sued for videotaping dozens of women in the restroom of a restaurant he owned.
 Havelock Ellis: British sexologist who was impotent until at age sixty he discovered that he was aroused by the sight of a woman urinating.
 Albert Fish: an American serial killer, also known as The Grayman and The Boogeyman. He wrote several letters to widows with want-ads in The New York Times and described in detail women urinating on him, inside of him, and in cups so that he could drink it. He later forced children to drink urine.
 Ashley MacIsaac: Nova Scotian fiddler and singer. In 1996 he spoke with a Maclean's interviewer mentioning his sexual life, including his boyfriend and his taste for urolagnia. In 2003 he told an interviewer for the Montreal Mirror that he loves to have men urinate on him.
 Ricky Martin: a Puerto Rican singer. He gave an interview with Blender magazine in which he stated that he enjoyed "giving the golden shower".
 Patrice O'Neal: American standup comedian who had on several occasions mentioned his appreciation for golden showers, even stating that his girlfriend noticing that his urine tasted like "birthday cake" is how he came to find out that he suffered from diabetes.
 Annie Sprinkle: an American porn actress, later turned sex educator and advocate for female sexual enjoyment. Her stage name is derived from her obsession with fluids.
 Troughman: an Australian noted in the Sydney media for lying down in urinal troughs at Sydney Mardi Gras parties and other events.
 Ian Watkins: the former lead singer for the Welsh rock band Lostprophets. Convicted in December 2013 of numerous child sex abuse charges, which include urolagnia.

See also
 Urination and sexual activity
 Urophagia

References

External links

Paraphilias
Sexual acts
Urine
Sexual fetishism
Human sexuality